Mohd Arfan bin Rashid (born 5 March 1991, in Alor Setar, Kedah) is a Malaysian football midfielder currently playing for Kedah FA.

Arfan, a member of the team that came runner-up in the 2009 Kings' Gold Cup, was promoted to the senior squad after Kedah coach Haji Ahmad Yusof brought him in as backup for current midfielder players. Ahmad was forced to bring another midfielder after Ahmad Fauzi Saari faced with a serious knee injury.

Arfan made his competitive debut for Kedah FA in a Malaysia Super League match against Johor FA in a 3–0 win on 9 January 2010.

References

1991 births
Living people
Malaysian footballers
Kedah Darul Aman F.C. players
People from Kedah
Association football midfielders